Lincoln and Niagara was a federal electoral district represented in the House of Commons of Canada from 1883 to 1904. It was located in the province of Ontario. This riding was created from parts of Lincoln and Niagara ridings.

It was initially defined as consisting of the town and township of Niagara, the city of St. Catharines, the townships of Grantham, Clinton and Louth, and the villages of Beamsville, Merritton and Port Dalhousie.

In 1892, the townships of Pelham and Gainsborough were added to the riding.  The townships were transferred from the defunct electoral district of Monck

The electoral district was abolished in 1903 when it was redistributed between Lincoln and Welland ridings.

Electoral history

|}

|}

On Mr. Rykert's resignation, 2 May 1890:

 

|}

|}

On the election being declared void, 16 November 1891:
 

|}

|}

|}

See also 

 List of Canadian federal electoral districts
 Past Canadian electoral districts

External links 
 Parliamentary website

Former federal electoral districts of Ontario